The eastern long-billed lark (Certhilauda semitorquata), also known as the Kaffrarian long-billed lark or Eastern longbill  is a species of lark in the family Alaudidae. It is found in south-eastern Africa. Its natural habitat is subtropical or tropical dry lowland grassland.

Taxonomy and systematics

Subspecies 

Three subspecies are recognized: 
 C. s. transvaalensis - Roberts, 1936: Found in eastern South Africa
 C. s. semitorquata - Smith, 1836: Found in central South Africa
 C. s. algida - Quickelberge, 1967: Found in south-eastern South Africa

Some authorities consider the eastern long-billed lark to be a subspecies of the Cape long-billed lark.

References

eastern long-billed lark
eastern long-billed lark
Taxonomy articles created by Polbot